In mathematics, the formalism of B-admissible representations provides constructions of full Tannakian subcategories of the category of representations of a group G on finite-dimensional vector spaces over a given field E. In this theory, B is chosen to be a so-called (E, G)-regular ring, i.e. an E-algebra with an E-linear action of G satisfying certain conditions given below. This theory is most prominently used in p-adic Hodge theory to define important subcategories of p-adic Galois representations of the absolute Galois group of local and global fields.

(E, G)-rings and the functor D
Let G be a group and E a field. Let Rep(G) denote a non-trivial strictly full subcategory of the Tannakian category of E-linear representations of G on finite-dimensional vector spaces over E stable under subobjects, quotient objects, direct sums, tensor products, and duals.

An (E, G)-ring is a commutative ring B that is an E-algebra with an E-linear action of G. Let F = BG be the G-invariants of B. The covariant functor DB : Rep(G) → ModF defined by

is E-linear (ModF denotes the category of F-modules). The inclusion of DB(V) in B ⊗EV induces a homomorphism

called the comparison morphism.

Regular (E, G)-rings and B-admissible representations
An (E, G)-ring B is called regular if
B is reduced;
for every V in Rep(G), αB,V is injective;
every b ∈ B for which the line bE is G-stable is invertible in B.
The third condition implies F is a field. If B is a field, it is automatically regular.

When B is regular,

with equality if, and only if, αB,V is an isomorphism.

A representation V ∈ Rep(G) is called B-admissible if αB,V is an isomorphism. The full subcategory of B-admissible representations, denoted RepB(G), is Tannakian.

If B has extra structure, such as a filtration or an E-linear endomorphism, then DB(V) inherits this structure and the functor DB can be viewed as taking values in the corresponding category.

Examples
Let K be a field of characteristic p (a prime), and Ks a separable closure of K. If E = Fp (the finite field with p elements) and G = Gal(Ks/K) (the absolute Galois group of K), then B = Ks is a regular (E, G)-ring. On Ks there is an injective Frobenius endomorphism σ : Ks → Ks sending x to xp. Given a representation G → GL(V) for some finite-dimensional Fp-vector space V,  is a finite-dimensional vector space over F=(Ks)G = K which inherits from B = Ks an injective function φD : D → D which is σ-semilinear (i.e. φ(ad) = σ(a)φ(d) for all a ∈ K and all d ∈ D). The Ks-admissible representations are the continuous ones (where G has the Krull topology and V has the discrete topology). In fact,  is an equivalence of categories between the Ks-admissible representations (i.e. continuous ones) and the finite-dimensional vector spaces over K equipped with an injective σ-semilinear φ.

Potentially B-admissible representations
A potentially B-admissible representation captures the idea of a representation that becomes  B-admissible when restricted to some subgroup of G.

Notes

References

Representation theory of groups